The 1904 United States presidential election in Rhode Island took place on November 8, 1904 as part of the 1904 United States presidential election. Voters chose four representatives, or electors to the Electoral College, who voted for president and vice president.

Rhode Island overwhelmingly voted for the Republican nominee, President Theodore Roosevelt, over the Democratic nominee, former Chief Judge of New York Court of Appeals Alton B. Parker. Roosevelt won Rhode Island by a margin of 24.42%.

Results

See also
 United States presidential elections in Rhode Island

References

Rhode Island
1904
1904 Rhode Island elections